Pierre Péju (born 1946) is a French philosopher, novelist and essayist. Born in Lyon, he studied at the Sorbonne. He has published a number of works in different literary genres, the best-known of which are two prize-winning novels Le rire de l’ogre and La petite Chartreuse. Both titles are studied in French schools and lycees, and both have been translated into English, the former by Euan Cameron and the latter (The Girl from the Chartreuse) by Ina Rilke.

References

20th-century French writers
21st-century French writers
20th-century French essayists
Prix du Livre Inter winners
French art critics
Writers from Lyon
1946 births
Living people
20th-century French male writers
French male non-fiction writers
Chevaliers of the Ordre des Arts et des Lettres